The Saturdays: Our Story is the autobiography of English-Irish pop group The Saturdays, which was published in October 2010. The book was written with a ghostwriter and published by the Transworld imprint Bantam Press.

The autobiography was announced through The Saturdays official website in March 2010. The 250-page book also includes an insight into each of the girls' personal lives, their success with The Saturdays.

References

2010 non-fiction books
Music autobiographies
The Saturdays
Transworld Publishers books
Bantam Press books